Papilio filaprae is a species of swallowtail butterfly from the genus Papilio that is found in Cameroon, the Democratic Republic of the Congo, the Republic of the Congo, Angola and Equatorial Guinea. The species was first described by Ernst Suffert in 1904.

Subspecies
Papilio filaprae filaprae (south-eastern Cameroon, Congo, south-western Republic of the Congo, Angola)
Papilio filaprae musolanus (Hancock, 1988)

Taxonomy
It is a member of the zenobia species group. In the zenobia group the basic upperside wing pattern is black with white or yellowish bands and spots. The underside is brown and basally there is a red area marked with black stripes and spots. In the discal area there is a yellowish band with black stripes and veins. Females resemble Amauris butterflies. Both sexes lack tails.

The clade members are:
Papilio cyproeofila Butler, 1868
Papilio fernandus Fruhstorfer, 1903
Papilio filaprae Suffert, 1904
Papilio gallienus Distant, 1879
Papilio mechowi Dewitz, 1881
Papilio mechowianus Dewitz, 1885
Papilio nobicea Suffert, 1904
Papilio zenobia Fabricius, 1775

Larsen, 2005  doubts that this is a valid taxon, suggesting that it is the equatorial subspecies of Papilio cyproeofila, which it closely resembles.

References

External links

swallowtails.net Image
Butterfly Corner Images from Naturhistorisches Museum Wien
Global Butterfly Information System Images (as subgenus Druryia)
"Papilio filaprae Suffert, 1904".  Insecta.pro. With image.

filaprae
Butterflies described in 1904